The commuter rail systems of Spain's major metropolitan areas are called Cercanías in most of Spain, Rodalia in the Valencian Community, Aldiriak in the Basque Country and Rodalies in Catalonia. There are twelve Cercanías systems in and around the cities of Asturias, Bilbao, Cádiz, Catalonia, Madrid, Málaga, Murcia/Alicante, Santander, San Sebastián, Seville, Valencia and Zaragoza. They are linked to Metro systems in Madrid, Barcelona, Bilbao and Valencia.

The Cercanías division of Renfe was created in 1989 on the advice of engineer and transit planner Javier Bustinduy (es; 1949–2016), as part of a major effort to massively increase ridership, frequencies and hence attractiveness of commuter rail systems in Spain. Cercanías systems are gradually in the process of being transferred to the regional autonomous governments; the first such system to be transferred was the management of the former Cercanías Barcelona/Rodalia Barcelona to the Government of Catalonia and renaming to "Rodalies de Catalunya" in 2010. The Madrid Cercanías network was the target of the 2004 Madrid train bombings. The attacks, which killed 191 people in Santa Eugenia, El Pozo and Atocha stations, were the bloodiest terrorist actions in Spain to date.

List of Cercanías / Rodalies / Rodalia / Aldiriak systems

Rolling stock 
The Cercanías services use the following rolling stock. In 2021, Renfe announced the purchase of 59 Stadler KISS trainsets to complement the fleet.

References

External links 
 RENFE Cercanías website
 See also Cercanías on Ferropedia